
Wollerich is a restaurant located in Sint-Oedenrode, in the Netherlands. It is a fine dining restaurant that was awarded one Michelin star in the period 1997–2007 and 2010–present.

Gault Millau awarded the restaurant 17 out of 20 points.

Head chef of Wollerich is Gerard Wollerich.

In 2008, there was great consternation when the restaurant unexpectedly lost its Michelin star. This despite the high score in the Gault Millau. In 2010, the restaurant won its star back.

Wollerich is a member of Alliance Gastronomique Néerlandaise.

See also
List of Michelin starred restaurants in the Netherlands

References 

Restaurants in the Netherlands
Michelin Guide starred restaurants in the Netherlands
Restaurants in North Brabant
Meierijstad